Bruce Kent Bateman is an American movie producer and director.

Personal life
Bateman is the father of actors Jason Bateman and Justine Bateman. Kent Bateman was a film producer for Ealing Films (not to be confused with the British studio) in the late 1960s and early 1970s in Newton, Massachusetts.

Filmography
1971 The Headless Eyes – Director / Screenwriter
1976 Death on Credit – Actor
1981 Land of No Return – Director / Producer / Screenwriter
1987 Teen Wolf Too – Producer
1988 Moving Target (NBC Movie of the Week) (starring his son, Jason Bateman) -- Executive Director, Producer 
1992 Breaking the Rules – Actor: Mr. Stepler / Producer

References

External links

American male film actors
American film directors
American film producers
American television directors
American television producers
Year of birth missing (living people)
Living people